The Parque Nacional Del Este (or National Park of the East) is located in eastern  Dominican Republic.  Founded on September 16, 1975, the park consists of 31,244 Ha of open space on the southeastern peninsula of Hispaniola and 10,650 Ha on Saona Island, a popular tourist destination, totaling 41,894 Ha in protected area.  The protected area also includes a 12,000 Ha buffer zone around the park boundaries.

World Heritage Status 
This site was added to the UNESCO World Heritage Tentative List on November 21, 2001 in the Mixed (Cultural & Natural) category.

Notes

References 
Parque Nacional del Este - UNESCO World Heritage Centre Accessed 2009-02-26.

National parks of the Dominican Republic
Geography of La Altagracia Province
Tourist attractions in La Altagracia Province
Protected areas established in 1975
1975 establishments in North America